The 1966 Maryland gubernatorial election was held on November 8, 1966. Incumbent Democratic Governor J. Millard Tawes was unable to seek a third term in office. In the election to succeed him, George P. Mahoney, a controversial segregationist, emerged from the Democratic primary due to splintered support for the two major candidates. Baltimore County Executive Spiro Agnew, was nominated by the Republican Party as their gubernatorial candidate. Mahoney and Agnew squared off, along with independent candidate Hyman A. Pressman. Ultimately, Agnew was victorious over Mahoney, with Pressman a distant third. This year was the last time that the state of Maryland elected a Republican governor until 2002. Agnew was later nominated for Vice President by the Republican National Convention, per Richard Nixon's request, in 1968, an election he and Nixon won.

 this marks the last time the following Independent city and Counties have voted Republican in a gubernatorial election: Baltimore City, Montgomery, and Prince George’s.

Democratic primary

Candidates
George P. Mahoney, Baltimore paving contractor and perennial candidate
Carlton R. Sickles, United States Congressman from Maryland's At-large congressional district
Thomas B. Finan, Attorney General of Maryland
Clarence W. Miles, lawyer and community activist
Charles J. Luthardt, Sr.
Morgan L. Amaimo, real estate broker and perennial candidate
Ross Zimmerman Pierpont, surgeon
Andrew J. Easter, perennial candidate

Results

Republican primary

Candidates
Baltimore County Executive Spiro Agnew
Andrew John Groszer, Jr.
John J. Harbaugh, Democratic candidate for the United States Senate in 1964
Henry J. Laque, Jr., perennial candidate
Louis R. Milio, Maryland congressional candidate

Results

General election

Campaign
Baltimore paving contractor and perennial candidate George P. Mahoney won the Democratic primary on a segregationist platform, which was possible due to the presence of several strong candidates. Mahoney's slogan, "Your home is your castle--protect it", as well as his stance on many civil rights issues, prompted Baltimore City Comptroller Hyman A. Pressman to enter the race as an independent candidate. Mahoney's controversial stances caused many in the Maryland Democratic Party to split their support between Agnew, which was possible due to his socially progressive views, and Pressman, which enabled Agnew to win the election with a plurality, taking 70% of the black vote.

Results

References

1966
Gubernatorial
1966 United States gubernatorial elections
November 1966 events in the United States